Lipika Singh Darai is an Indian filmmaker and film director based in Bhubaneswar, Odisha. She has won four National Film Awards.

News and Articles

Living people
People from Mayurbhanj district
Film directors from Odisha
Indian women filmmakers
Year of birth missing (living people)